The women's 60 metres event  at the 1984 European Athletics Indoor Championships was held on 4 March.

Medalists

Results

Heats
First 3 from each heat (Q) and the next 2 fastest (q) qualified for the final.

Final

References

60 metres at the European Athletics Indoor Championships
60
Euro